That Obscure Object of Desire is a 1977 comedy-drama film directed by Luis Buñuel, based on the 1898 novel The Woman and the Puppet by Pierre Louÿs. It was Buñuel's final directorial effort before his death in July 1983. Set in Spain and France against the backdrop of a terrorist insurgency, the film conveys the story told through a series of flashbacks by an aging Frenchman, Mathieu (played by Fernando Rey), who recounts falling in love with a beautiful young Spanish woman, Conchita (played interchangeably by two actresses, Carole Bouquet and Ángela Molina), who repeatedly frustrates his romantic and sexual desires.

In recent years, the film has been highly acclaimed by critics.

Plot
A dysfunctional and sometimes violent romance happens between Mathieu (Fernando Rey), a middle-aged, wealthy Frenchman, and a young, impoverished, and beautiful flamenco dancer from Seville, Conchita, played by Carole Bouquet and Ángela Molina. The two actresses each appear unpredictably in separate scenes, and differ not only physically, but temperamentally as well.

Most of the film is a flashback recalled by Mathieu. The movie opens with Mathieu travelling by train from Seville to Paris. He is trying to distance himself from his young girlfriend Conchita. As Mathieu's train is ready to depart, he finds that a bruised and bandaged Conchita is pursuing him. From the train he pours a bucket of water over her head. He believes this will deter her, but she sneaks aboard.

Mathieu's fellow compartment passengers witness his rude act. These include a mother and her young daughter, a judge who is coincidentally a friend of Mathieu's cousin, and a psychologist who is a dwarf. They inquire about his motivation for such an act, and he then explains the history of his tumultuous relationship with Conchita. The story is set against a backdrop of terrorist bombings and shootings by left-wing groups.

Conchita, who claims to be 18 but looks older, has vowed to remain a virgin until marriage. She tantalizes Mathieu with sexual promises, but never allows him to satisfy his sexual desire. At one point she goes to bed with him wearing a tightly laced canvas corset, which he cannot untie, making it impossible to have sexual intercourse. Conchita's antics cause the couple to break up and reunite repeatedly, each time frustrating and confusing Mathieu.

Eventually, Mathieu finds Conchita dancing nude for tourists in a Seville nightclub. At first, he becomes enraged. Later, however, he forgives her and buys her a house. In a climactic scene, soon after moving into the house, Conchita refuses to let Mathieu in at the gate, tells him that she hates him, and that kissing and touching him make her sick. Then, to prove her independence, she appears to initiate sexual intercourse with a young man in plain view of Mathieu, although he walks away without witnessing the act.  Later that night he is held up at gunpoint as his car is hijacked.

After this, Conchita attempts to reconcile with Mathieu, insisting that the sex was fake and that her "lover" is in reality a homosexual friend. However, during her explanation, Mathieu beats her (she then says "Now I'm sure you love me"), causing her bandaged and bruised state seen earlier in the film.

Just as the fellow train passengers seem satisfied with this story, Conchita reappears from hiding and dumps a bucket of water on Mathieu. However, the couple apparently reconcile yet again when the train reaches its destination. After leaving the train, they walk arm in arm, enjoying the streets of Madrid.

Later in a mall in Paris, loudspeakers announce that a strange alliance of extremist groups intends to sow chaos and confusion in society through terrorist attacks. The announcement adds that several right-wing groups plan to counter-attack. As the couple continues their walk, they pass a seamstress in a shop window mending a bloody nightgown. They begin arguing just as a bomb explodes, apparently killing them.

Casting
That Obscure Object of Desire is most notable for its use of two actresses, Carole Bouquet and Ángela Molina, in the single role of Conchita; the actresses switch roles in alternate scenes and sometimes even in the middle of scenes. In his autobiography, My Last Sigh (1983), Buñuel explains (pp. 46–47) the decision to use two actresses to play Conchita:

The book does not identify the actress who had caused the "tempestuous argument," though Buñuel makes it clear (p. 250) that she was neither Carole Bouquet nor Angela Molina.

In Luis Buñuel: The Complete Films (2005), editors Bill Krohn and Paul Duncan identify the actress as Maria Schneider, writing (pp. 177–78) the following in regard to the idea of using two actresses to play Conchita:

Specifically regarding Buñuel's employment of two actresses to play a single character, most critics were charmed, as exemplified by New York Times film critic Vincent Canby's review: 

Other films that employ two or more actors to perform a single character include Todd Solondz's Palindromes, wherein eight different actors of different ages, races, and genders play a 13-year-old girl named Aviva during the course of the film; Terry Gilliam's The Imaginarium of Doctor Parnassus, where similarly a production issue—in this case the death of Heath Ledger during production—led to Johnny Depp, Colin Farrell and Jude Law stepping in to play his character's "imaginary world" scenes; and Canadian filmmaker B. P. Paquette's Perspective, wherein each of the three lead actors continually rotate the three characters they play, not only within the same scene, but sometimes during the same dialogue exchange.

Spanish actor Fernando Rey frequently worked with Buñuel in his later years. He plays Mathieu, but his voice is dubbed by the French actor Michel Piccoli.

Ángela Molina revealed Luis Buñuel needed to see her completely naked during the audition: "There were nude scenes, and I imagine he needed convincing that I was what he required for his film, or whatever. He had to see the way I looked. I was wearing the same dressing gown that appeared in the film. He put his glasses on. It was a long changing room, and he was at one end of it, and then he said, with an absolutely loving and affectionately paternal smile... let's see, I don't remember what exact word he used, but I knew I had to expose myself. So, I opened my dressing gown for a moment like a little girl, because that's what I was. I was very innocent at that time. And then he put his glasses on immediately and said: 'Cover yourself! Cover yourself!' All this as though they were uncovering Tutankhamun's mummy," Molina laughing recalled.

Reception
The film was not financially successful, but it became a critical favorite, garnering Best Foreign Language Film nominations at both the Golden Globe Awards and the Academy Awards (where it was also nominated for Best Writing, Screenplay Based on Material from Another Medium) but failing to win at either. The critics associations were slightly more generous, with the National Board of Review and the Los Angeles Film Critics Association both giving it the Best Foreign Language Film awards in 1977. Luis Buñuel won Best Director at the National Board of Review and National Society of Film Critics awards. He was also nominated at the French César Awards.

Many later critics have declared the film a masterpiece. The film holds a 97% approval rating on Rotten Tomatoes, with an average rating of 8.8/10 among 33 critics. The site's consensus reads: "That Obscure Object of Desire is a frequently unsettling treatise on the quixotic nature of lust and love". In the British Film Institute's 2012 Sight & Sound poll, three critics and two directors ranked it one of the ten greatest films ever made.

See also
 List of submissions to the 50th Academy Awards for Best Foreign Language Film
 List of Spanish submissions for the Academy Award for Best Foreign Language Film

Sources
That Obscure Object of Desire, DVD, Criterion Collection; Jean-Claude Carrière Interview (2000)

References

Bibliography

External links
 
 
 
That Obscure Object of Desire an essay by William Rothman at the Criterion Collection
 Review by Roger Ebert

1977 films
1977 comedy-drama films
1970s avant-garde and experimental films
1970s black comedy films
1977 multilingual films
1970s satirical films
1970s sex comedy films
Films about interclass romance
Films about sexual repression
Films based on French novels
Films directed by Luis Buñuel
Films produced by Serge Silberman
Films set in Madrid
Films set in Paris
Films set in Seville
Films shot in Madrid
Films shot in Paris
Films with screenplays by Jean-Claude Carrière
Films shot in Switzerland
French avant-garde and experimental films
French comedy-drama films
1970s French-language films
French multilingual films
French satirical films
French sex comedy films
Spanish avant-garde and experimental films
Spanish comedy-drama films
1970s Spanish-language films
Spanish multilingual films
Spanish satirical films
Films based on works by Pierre Louÿs
1970s French films
1970s Spanish films